Kaššaya or Kashshaya was a princess of Babylon, daughter of Nebuchadnezzar II.
Kaššaya was the eldest daughter of king Nebuchadnezzar II (605-562 BC). She is documented as a historical person in cuneiform economic texts. One of the preserved cuneiform texts mentions that, in her father's 31 years of reign, she received large quantities of blue wool for making ullâku robes.

According to another text, she gave the land to the temple of the goddess Ishtar in the city of Uruk. Kaššaya might have been the wife of Neriglissar, who in August 560 B.C., after murdering his brother-in-law Amel-Marduk, took the throne of Babylon. It is also possible that Neriglissar was married to another of Nebuchadnezzar's daughters.

References

6th-century BC people
6th-century BC women
Babylonian women
Ancient princesses
Neo-Babylonian Empire
Chaldean dynasty